Hans Heinrich Bass (born 1 April 1954) is a German Economist and Economic Historian and professor at the City University of Applied Sciences, Bremen, Germany.

Bass obtained his M. A. in Economics and his PhD in Economics and Social Sciences under the supervision of Richard H. Tilly from the University of Münster, Germany.

Bass was Senior Lecturer at the Small Enterprise Promotion and Training Programme (sept) of the University of Bremen, Assistant Professor at the Institute of World Economics and International Management (East Asia Department and Africa Department), University of Bremen and Visiting Professor at Tongji University (Shanghai, China), Xi'an Jiaotong University (Xi'an, China), Aichi University (Toyohashi, Japan), the National Center for Management and Administration (Ibadan, Nigeria), Russian Foreign Trade Academy (Moscow, Russia), and at the University of Benin (Benin City, Nigeria).

He is co-editor of the African Development Perspectives Yearbook and has served as an advisor to various international organizations including United Nations Industrial Development Organisation  and non-governmental organizations (NGO), including Deutsche Welthungerhilfe und foodwatch.

His research interests include International Economics, SME Economics, Development Economics, and Economic History.

References 

1954 births
Living people
German economists
Academic staff of the University of Bremen
University of Münster alumni